Sorry Saranghaeyo (Kaorak thi kaoli Sorry saranghaeyo) is a 2010 Thai film directed and written by Poj Arnon

Summary
Kana, a Thai girl who crazies in the Korean drama The Prince of Red Shoe and a Korean idol Ajoo, she traveled to South Korea with her family and friends.

In South Korea, she accidentally meets Ajoo by her dreams and cause the chaos followed.

Cast
Haru Yamaguchi as Kana (Chinese kale) 
Ajoo as Himself
Saran Sirilak as Won
Kachapa Toncharoen as Elisa
Thanya Rattanamalakul as Mara (Gourd) (before surgery)
Patrick Paiyer as Zen
Guy Ratchanont as Chai
Phutawan Techatewnich as Kwangtung (Bok choy)
Wasana Chalakorn as Grandma
Nareekrajang Kantamas as Mom
Pan Plutaek as Dad
Anusorn Naiyanan as Methun (Gemini)
Hedpoh Chernyim as Cherry
Sarinee Dokkadone as Strawberry
Meytika Puttavibul as Muaylek (Maknae)
Arisara Thongborisut as Mara (after surgery) (cameo)
Pavarisa Phenjati as Herself (cameo)
Lim So Hee as Korean surgeon (cameo)
Oh Chang Suk as Ajoo's manager (cameo)

Trivia
The Prince of Red Shoe, a Korean drama that Kana is addicted to. Its title derives from a Thai entertainment scandal in 2009 when famous singer Nathan Oman claimed he was filming a Hollywood movie The Prince of Red Shoe in the Middle East alongside world-class performers Bruce Willis and Christina Ricci, he also claimed that the movie was directed by Wolfgang Petersen. Before society busted that it was actually a story that he faked all over.

See also
Hello Stranger

References

External links
 
Official trailer

Thai comedy films
Thai LGBT-related films
Transgender-related films
Films shot in South Korea
Films set in South Korea
Films set in Seoul
Thai-language films
2010s Korean-language films
2010 comedy films
2010 films
Films directed by Poj Arnon